Yasuhiro Vandewalle (born 18 May 1970) is a Belgian backstroke swimmer. He competed in three events at the 1992 Summer Olympics.

References

External links
 

1970 births
Living people
Belgian male backstroke swimmers
Olympic swimmers of Belgium
Swimmers at the 1992 Summer Olympics
Sportspeople from Bruges